Laurence Harrington (born 30 September 1938) is a British actor who has played DS Probert in Z-Cars, Lunar Guard in Doctor Who, George Latimer in Softly, Softly, the Lawyer in The Sweeney, Jackson in Space: 1999, Gary in Agony, Jeff Sadler in Boon, Ricky Price and Cyril Harrington-Morse in two separate episodes on Lovejoy, Vic Lawson in Love Hurts and James Palfrey in Dalziel and Pascoe. He has also guest-starred in Agatha Christie's Poirot, The Bill, Casualty, Holby City and Doctors, and appeared in films such as The Boys in Blue (1982), Don't Open till Christmas (1984), Car Trouble (1986), Out of Order (1987) and Afraid of the Dark (1991). Harrington also appeared in the British band Naked Eyes' 1984 music Video "(What) In the Name of Love". He also starred in Upstairs Downstairs as Chief Petty Officer Webb in an episode called Facing Fearful Odds.

Filmography

External links
 

British male soap opera actors
1938 births
Living people